Ingestre and Weston railway station was a former British railway station to serve the village of  Ingestre in Staffordshire.

It was opened by the Stafford and Uttoxeter Railway in 1867. Originally called Ingestre it was actually much closer to Weston and was renamed (also Ingestre for Weston) in 1870 to avoid confusion with Weston and Ingestre on the North Staffordshire Railway.

The Stafford and Uttoxeter Railway was purchased for £100,000 by the Great Northern Railway in July 1881 and the line subsequently passed into LNER ownership with Railway Grouping in 1923.

Proceeding north west the line passed over the North Staffordshire Railway's main line from Stone to Colwich, the line climbed slightly towards Chartley and Stowe.

Passenger services finished in 1939.

References

Further reading

Disused railway stations in Staffordshire
Former Great Northern Railway stations
Railway stations in Great Britain opened in 1867
Railway stations in Great Britain closed in 1939